The belted plaid (or a plaid worn belted) is a large blanket-like piece of fabric which is wrapped around the body with the material pleated or, more accurately, loosely gathered and secured at the waist by means of a belt. Typically, a portion of the belted plaid hangs down to about the knees (for men) or ankles (for women) with the rest of the material being wrapped up around the upper body in a variety of ways and pinned or otherwise secured to keep it in place.

The belted plaid was a standard item of men's Highland dress from the late 16th century until the middle of the 18th century. It was also the precursor of the modern tailored kilt.

Terminology

The word plaide in Gaelic roughly means blanket, and that was the original term for the garment. The belted plaid has been and is often referred to by a variety of different terms, including féileadh-mór, breacan an fhéilidh, and very commonly, the "great kilt", however the garment was most definitely not known by the name "great kilt" during the years when it was in common use.

Both the terms féileadh-mór and breacan an fhéilidh are Gaelic terms, the former meaning roughly "large wrap" and the latter roughly meaning "tartan wrap". Women's ankle-length belted plaids are called earasaidean.

Description and history

It was typically worn as a kind of mantle or cloak cast about the shoulders. In the latter part of the 16th century, some in the Highlands of Scotland began putting a belt around their waist on the outside of the plaid, after first pleating or gathering the fabric.

Documentary evidence
The first clear reference to the belted plaid occurs in the year 1594. In that year, a group of Highlanders from the Western Isles went to Ireland to fight under Red Hugh O'Donnell. Writing about them, Lughaidh noted that despite being dressed similarly they could be distinguished from the Irish soldiers:

"They were recognized among the Irish soldiers by the distinction of their arms and clothing ... for their exterior dress was mottled cloaks of many colours ..., their belts were over their loins outside their cloaks."

A surviving woman's plaid dated 1726 exists (reconstruction, displayed worn as an earasaid). 

A surviving men's belted plaid from 1822 has a horizontal seam and small belt loops sewn across it at each pattern repeat, such that it could be rapidly pleated with a drawstring, or flattened entirely into a blanket.

Cloth
The belted plaid was made from wool or a wool / linen combination and twill, often woven in a pattern of coloured stripes in one or both directions. This gave a pattern of stripes or checks. The latter has today become known as tartan, though originally the word tartan referred to the type of cloth used, and not the pattern of colours, as the word almost exclusively signifies today.

These tartan patterns (or Setts) were apparently chosen based on a sense of fashion or the availability and expense of natural dyes in the area of manufacture. The modern notion of "clan tartans" whereby each clan or name is associated with a particular design did not exist at that time, but instead dates back to the early 19th century.

Customary use
The belted plaid was used not only as a garment, but also as bedding at night, the wearer wrapping himself in it and sleeping directly on the ground.

During the years preceding the Battle of Culloden, to the extent that Highlanders wore any kind of kilt-like garment, it was the belted plaid and not the modern tailored kilt.

The kilt at Highland Games
At nearly every Highland Games gathering there are vendors selling tartan items, whether tailored kilts, blankets, scarves, ties, or tartan fabric. By far the greatest proportion of their sales in the category of Highland dress are related to "modern" Highland attire, especially the modern tailored kilt and its accessories. Yet the belted plaid is seldom seen today at gatherings of highlanders, and even knowledge of this garment is not widespread.

The present-day Highland Games trace their origins back to the early 19th century interest in matters related to Highland culture. This interest manifested itself in various reconstructionist events purportedly designed as a celebration of that earlier Gaelic Highland and Celtic culture, but such cultures never wore garments like the modern tailored kilt.

The modern short kilt is called féileadh beag ("little wrap"), and often Anglicized to philabeg or filibeg, with various spellings. Its origins are still debated; what is clear is that the philabeg developed from the belted plaid sometime in the early 18th century, or perhaps somewhat earlier. The philabeg consisted essentially of the lower half of a plaid, gathered or pleated and held around the waist with a belt. Later, the gatherings were stitched down to hold them in place, and thus originated the modern tailored kilt.

Some speculate the modern "sport / half-plaid kilt" was derived from miners, or fashion, due to it being half the cost of a full belted plaid, whereupon one can choose either a fly plaid or not. This would have helped at the Battle of the Shirts.

Gallery images

See also
 Earasaid
 History of the kilt
 Poncho, a garment that could also serve as a blanket.
 Matchcoat

Footnotes

References

External links

Scottish clothing
Robes and cloaks